Seneschalstown GAA is a small rural Gaelic Athletic Association club from Beauparc/Kentstown parish in County Meath, founded in 1932. The club ground is situated about 6 miles east of Navan and 3 miles south of Slane.

The club has a history in all levels of GAA football over the years and more recently with both its Senior Men and Ladies' teams. It has enjoyed much success in all competitions and has been fortunate to have many players represent the county teams with distinction.

Honours

Meath Senior Football Championship: 4
1972, 1994, 2007, 2009
Meath Senior Football League: 3
1972, 1992, 2002
Meath Senior Football Feis Cup: 7
1971, 1972, 1992, 1994, 2000, 2007, 2008
Meath Intermediate Football Championship: 2
1940, 1967
Meath Junior Football Championship: 1
1936
Meath Junior B Football Championship: 1
1973, 1996, 2015
Meath Junior D Football Championship: 1
2003, 2015
Meath Under-21 Football Championship:
1970, 1971, 1972, 1992, 2012

Ladies' Honours

 Senior Club All-Ireland Runners up :
2003
 Leinster Ladies' Senior Club Football Championship :
2003
 Senior Championship : 13
 2000, 2001, 2002, 2003, 2005, 2006, 2007, 2008, 2009, 2011, 2012, 2013, 2014
 Senior League :
1999, 2000, 2001, 2002, 2003, 2005, 2006, 2008, 2009
 Junior :
1998
 Under-21 :
1999

Notable players
 Colm Coyle
 Graham Geraghty
 Joe Sheridan

External links
 https://web.archive.org/web/20101027041236/http://www.seneschalstowngaa.com/default.aspx

Gaelic games clubs in County Meath